Allio is an Italian surname. People with this surname include:

 René Allio (1924–1995), French film director
 Matteo di Guaro Allio (1605–1670), Italian sculptor
 Domenico dell'Allio (1505–1563), Italian architect.
 Donato Felice d'Allio (1677–1761), Austrian architect

Allio may also refer to:
 AlLiO2, the chemical formula for lithium aluminate

See also 
 Aglio, a similar surname

References 

Italian-language surnames